Good Charlotte's songs and albums have received recognition at the MTV Australia Awards, the MTV Europe Music Awards, and the MTV Video Music Awards. "The Anthem" is the second single from the band's second album The Young and the Hopeless. The song was awarded the "Best Rock Video" award from the MTV Video Music Awards Japan and the "Peoples Choice: Favorite International Group" award from the MuchMusic Video Awards. The band itself has received awards including "Fave International Band" at the Nickelodeon Australian Kids' Choice Awards, "Best International Group" at the NRJ Music Awards, and "Best International Rock Act" at the TMF Awards. As of 2020, Good Charlotte has received nine awards from twenty-one nominations.

Kerrang! Awards
The Kerrang! Awards is an annual awards ceremony held by Kerrang!, a British rock magazine.

|-
|rowspan="2"| 2003 || "Lifestyles of the Rich and Famous" || Best Single || 
|-
| Good Charlotte || Best International Band || 
|-
| 2005 || "The Chronicles of Life and Death" || Best Video ||

MTV Australia Awards
The MTV Australia Awards is an annual awards ceremony established in 2005 by MTV Australia.

|-
|rowspan="3"| 2007 ||rowspan="3"| "Keep Your Hands off My Girl" || Viewers Choice Australia || 
|-
| Best Group || 
|-
| Best Rock Video ||

MTV Europe Music Awards
The MTV Europe Music Awards is an annual awards ceremony established in 1994 by MTV Europe.

|-
|rowspan="2"| 2003 || Good Charlotte || Best Rock || 
|-
| Good Charlotte || Best New Act || 
|-
| 2004 || Good Charlotte || Best Rock || 
|-
| 2007 || Good Charlotte || Best Band ||

MTV Video Music Awards
The MTV Video Music Awards were established in 1984 by MTV to celebrate the top music videos of the year.

|-
|rowspan="3"| 2003 ||rowspan="3"| "Lifestyles of the Rich and Famous" || Viewer's Choice || 
|-
| Best Rock Video || 
|-
| Best Group Video || 
|-
|rowspan="2"| 2004 ||rowspan="2"| "Hold On" || Best Group Video || 
|-
| Viewer's Choice ||

MTV Video Music Awards Japan
The MTV Video Music Awards Japan was established in 2002 and is presented by MTV Japan.

|-
| 2004 || "The Anthem" || Best Rock Video ||

MuchMusic Video Awards
The MuchMusic Video Awards is an annual awards ceremony presented by the Canadian music video channel MuchMusic.

|-
| 2003 || "The Anthem" || People's Choice: Favorite International Group ||

Nickelodeon Australian Kids' Choice Awards
The Nickelodeon Australian Kids' Choice Awards is an annual awards show which comments entertainers and is voted by children aged 12 to 19.

|-
| 2007 || Good Charlotte || Fave International Band ||

NRJ Music Awards
The NRJ Music Awards is an annual French awards ceremony created by the NRJ radio station and the TF1 television network.

|-
| 2004 || Good Charlotte || Best International Group ||

References

Good Charlotte Alternative Press Music Awards 2016